Anna Mercury is a comic book limited series created by Warren Ellis, published by Avatar Press, with art by Facundo Percio. Issue 1 was released on 2 April 2008.  Three issues of a second limited series titled Anna Mercury 2 have thus far been released.

Premise
Anna Mercury is a vinyl-clad, red-headed hero who travels between divergent worlds, fighting to keep advanced weaponry from being used by more primitive worlds. 

On Earth, in the modern day United Kingdom, Anna Mercury is actually Anna Louise Britton, an agent of the government, tasked with missions in the nine divergent worlds adjacent to our own. Anna's travels through the space between worlds charges her equipment that lets her defy gravity, move through solid objects, and perform other feats, though the energy is limited and must be monitored closely.

Collected editions
The first limited series has been collected into a single volume:

The Cutter (144 pages, March 2009, hardcover, softcover)

References

External links
 Anna Mercury - Avatar Press page
 PREVIEW: Warren Ellis' Anna Mercury #1, Comic Book Resources, April 1, 2008

Interviews
Who is "Anna Mercury?" Warren Ellis Gives Hints, Comic Book Resources, February 14, 2008
Warren Ellis on Anna Mercury, Newsarama, February 18, 2008

Reviews
 Sunday Slugfest: Anna Mercury #1, Comics Bulletin, April 6, 2008

Comics characters introduced in 2008
Comics by Warren Ellis